District Taco is a Mexican restaurant chain with 15 locations in the Mid-Atlantic region, mostly in the Washington, D.C., area. It serves Yucatan-style cuisine, including burritos, quesadillas, tacos, and other items. It was founded in 2009 as a food truck in Rosslyn, Virginia and opened its first traditional location in Arlington the next year. In 2018, it was announced that the chain plans to open a location in Downtown Silver Spring.  In 2016, founder Osiris Hoil was a winner of the Ernst & Young Entrepreneur of the Year award.

History

District Taco was founded by Osiris Hoil and Marc Wallace, in 2009 as a food truck in Rosslyn. At the time, Hoil had just been laid off from his construction job during the Great Recession and his neighbor, Marc Wallace encouraged him to go into the food business, selling the recipes he prepared at home. Wallace would help co-found the business. In November 2010, they opened their first brick and mortar restaurant on Lee Highway in Arlington. In the Spring of 2012, the chain opened its first location in the District of Columbia, finally living up to its name. By the summer of 2017, the chain had grown to include ten locations in Virginia and Washington, D.C. In November of that year, the chain opened its first location outside the Washington metro area and eleventh overall, in King of Prussia, Pennsylvania. The next month, they opened their first location in Maryland, in Riverdale Park. The company now operates 15 corporate locations in and around Washington DC and Philadelphia and, in 2021, launched its franchising subsidiary and signed its first franchise agreement to begin expansion in 2022.

Food

District Taco describes its cuisine as Yucatan-style, similar to what Hoil's mother used to prepare. These include burritos, quesadillas, tacos, and other offerings. The stores use only fresh ingredients, something Hoil said his mother always stressed when he was a child. The store is also open for breakfast, serving traditional items such as huevos rancheros in addition to Mexican-American options such as breakfast burritos.

References

2009 establishments in Virginia
Hispanic and Latino American culture in Maryland
Hispanic and Latino American culture in Virginia
Hispanic and Latino American culture in Washington, D.C.
Mexican-American cuisine
Mexican restaurants in the United States
Restaurants in Maryland
Restaurants in Virginia
Restaurants in Washington, D.C.
Restaurants established in 2009
American companies established in 2009
Hispanic and Latino American culture in Pennsylvania